"99 Luftballons" ("99 balloons") is a song by the German band Nena from their 1983 self-titled album. An English-language version titled "99 Red Balloons", with lyrics by Kevin McAlea, was also released on the album 99 Luftballons in 1984 after widespread success of the original in Europe and Japan. The English version is not a direct translation of the German original and contains lyrics with a somewhat different meaning. In the US, the English-language version did not chart, while the German-language recording became Nena's only US hit.

Lyrics
While at a June 1982 concert by the Rolling Stones in West Berlin, Nena's guitarist Carlo Karges noticed that balloons were being released. As he watched them move toward the horizon, he noticed them shifting and changing shapes, where they looked like strange spacecraft (referred to in the German lyrics as a "UFO"). He thought about what might happen if they floated over the Berlin Wall to the Soviet sector.

Also cited by the band was a newspaper article from the Las Vegas Review-Journal about five local high school students in 1973 who played a prank to simulate a UFO by launching 99 (one was lost from the original 100) aluminized Mylar balloons attached with ribbons to a traffic flare. The red flame from the flare reflected by the balloons gave the appearance of a large pulsating red object floating over Red Rock Canyon outside the Las Vegas Valley in Nevada.

A direct translation of the title is sometimes given as "Ninety-Nine Air Balloons", but the song became known in English as "Ninety-Nine Red Balloons". The title "99 Red Balloons" almost scans correctly with the syllables falling in the right places within the rhythm of the first line of lyrics, although Neunundneunzig (99) has one syllable more than "ninety-nine".

The lyrics of the original German version tell a story: 99 balloons are mistaken for UFOs, causing a military General Officer to send pilots to investigate. Finding nothing but balloons, the pilots put on a large show of fire power. The display of force worries the nations along the borders and the war ministers on each side encourage conflict to grab power for themselves. In the end, a cataclysmic war results from the otherwise harmless flight of balloons and causes devastation on all sides without a victor, as indicated in the denouement of the song: "," which means "99 years of war left no room for victors." The anti-war song finishes with the singer walking through the devastated ruins of the world and finding a single balloon. The description of what happens in the final line of the piece is the same in German and English: "," or "I think of you and let it go."

English version and other re-recordings
The English version retains the spirit of the original narrative, but many of the lyrics are translated poetically rather than being directly translated: red helium balloons are casually released by the civilian singer (narrator) with her unnamed friend into the sky and are mistakenly registered by a faulty early warning system as enemy contacts, resulting in panic and eventually nuclear war, with the end of the song near-identical to the end of the original German version.

From the outset Nena and other members of the band expressed disapproval of the English version of the song, "99 Red Balloons". In March 1984, the band's keyboardist and song co-writer Uwe Fahrenkrog Petersen said, "We made a mistake there. I think the song loses something in translation and even sounds silly." In another interview that month, the band, including Nena herself, were quoted as being "not completely satisfied" with the English version since it was "too blatant" for a group not wishing to be seen as a protest band.

Two re-recordings of the original German version of the song have been released by Nena: a modern ballad version, which was included on Nena feat. Nena (2002), and a 2009 retro version, which originally aired as an animated video on the European Arte channel (as part of a special called "Summer of the '80s") and included some portions in French (specifically, the second part of the first verse and the entire final verse). Nena later formally released this rendition on her 2010 Best of Nena compilation; however the French text was omitted and replaced with the original German lyrics.

Live recordings of the song are included on all seven of Nena's live albums, dating from 1995 to 2018.

Reception
It was certified Gold by the RIAA. The later-released English translation, "99 Red Balloons", topped the charts in the UK, Canada and Ireland.

In his 2010 book Music: What Happened?, critic and musician Scott Miller declared that the song possesses "one of the best hooks of the eighties" and listed it among his top song picks for 1984. Nonetheless, he cautioned: "It must be admitted that this song suffers from an embarrassingly out-of-place disco funk interlude, and the word Kriegsminister."

Music video
The promotional video, which was originally made for the Dutch music programme TopPop and broadcast on 13 March 1983, was shot in a Dutch military training camp, the band performing the song on a stage in front of a backdrop of fires and explosions provided by the Dutch Army. Towards the end of the video, the band are seen taking cover and abandoning the stage, which was unplanned and genuine since they believed the explosive blasts were getting out of control.

VH1 Classic, an American cable television station, ran a charity event for Hurricane Katrina relief in 2006. Viewers who made donations were allowed to choose which music videos the station would play. One viewer donated $35,000 for the right to program an entire hour and requested continuous play of "99 Luftballons" and "99 Red Balloons" videos. The station broadcast the videos as requested from 2:00 to 3:00p.m. EST on 26 March 2006.

Charts and certifications

German version

Weekly charts

Year-end charts

Certifications and sales

English version

Weekly charts

Year-end charts

Certifications and sales

2002 re-release

See also

List of anti-war songs
Lists of number-one singles (Austria)
List of number-one singles in Australia during the 1980s
List of number-one singles of 1984 (Canada)
List of Cash Box Top 100 number-one singles of 1984
List of Dutch Top 40 number-one singles of 1983
List of European number-one hits of 1983
List of number-one hits of 1983 (Germany)
List of number-one singles of 1984 (Ireland)
List of number-one singles from the 1980s (New Zealand)
List of number-one singles and albums in Sweden
List of number-one singles of the 1980s (Switzerland)
List of UK Singles Chart number ones of the 1980s
List of one-hit wonders in the United States

References

External links
"99 Luftballons" at the official Nena website

1983 songs
1983 singles
1984 singles
Nena (band) songs
Songs written by Jörn-Uwe Fahrenkrog-Petersen
Cashbox number-one singles
Columbia Records singles
Epic Records singles
Dutch Top 40 number-one singles
European Hot 100 Singles number-one singles
Irish Singles Chart number-one singles
Number-one singles in Australia
Number-one singles in Austria
Number-one singles in Germany
Number-one singles in New Zealand
Number-one singles in Sweden
Number-one singles in Switzerland
Oricon International Singles Chart number-one singles
RPM Top Singles number-one singles
UK Singles Chart number-one singles
Ultratop 50 Singles (Flanders) number-one singles
German-language songs
Anti-war songs
Protest songs
Songs about nuclear war and weapons
Songs about the military
Balloons (entertainment)
Cold War in popular culture